Blue is a 2003 South Korean war film directed by Lee Jung-gook focusing on elite rescue divers of the South Korea Navy. The film attracted 61,223 admissions in the nation's capital, Seoul.

Plot
Two friends in the South Korean navy, Lee and Kim are both part of an elite diving squad, specializing in emergency deep sea salvage dives. Lee is strait-laced and takes his duties seriously, while Kim treats the Navy as a lark. When Kang, a diving instructor and Kim's former girlfriend, is posted to the unit, this creates tension between the friends as they compete for Kang's affections.  The tension is heightened when Lee is promoted ahead of Kim, creating a rivalry between the two.  Kim's gung-ho approach to diving, and the danger he poses for himself (and his fellow divers), leads to further problems.  Matters come to a head when an incident at sea causes the sinking of a submarine, requiring the unit to attempt a dangerous salvage rescue of the sunken submarine.

Cast
 Shin Hyun-joon as Kim Jun
 Shin Eun-kyung as Kang Su-jin
 Kim Young-ho as Lee Tae-hyeon

See also 
 Cinema of Korea

References

External links
 
 

2003 films
2000s Korean-language films
South Korean war films
Films about the Republic of Korea Navy
2000s South Korean films